ASK/Brocēni/LMT was a professional basketball team that was located in Riga, Latvia that existed from 1992 to 2001. The club played in the Latvian Basketball League, winning eight consecutive titles from 1992 till 1999. Brocēni also were regular participants in European club competitions. After 2000-2001 season the team disappeared and soon after their place in Latvian league was taken by BK Skonto, although both teams are not related.

Honours

League 

Latvian League: 
Winners (8): 1992, 1993, 1994, 1995, 1996, 1997, 1998, 1999
Runners-up (2): 2000, 2001
NEBL
Winners (0): 
Runners-up (1): 1999

Season by season

Players

FIBA Hall of Famers

Notable players

Head coaches
 Nikolajs Balvačovs
 Armands Krauliņš
 Valdis Valters	 
 Jānis Zeltiņš

References

Basketball teams in Latvia
Sport in Riga
Basketball teams established in 1992
Basketball teams disestablished in 2001